SIAF may refer to:

 Safety Investigation Authority of Finland
 Swiss Institute of Allergy and Asthma Research